Tomasz "Tom" P. Malinowski (born September 23, 1965) is an American politician and diplomat who was the U.S. representative from New Jersey's 7th congressional district from 2019 to 2023. A Democrat, he served as Assistant Secretary of State for Democracy, Human Rights, and Labor in the Obama administration.

A vocal opponent of Donald Trump, Malinowski was first elected in 2018, defeating Republican incumbent Leonard Lance by five points. He was reelected in 2020 by a narrower margin against New Jersey State Senate's Minority Leader, Thomas Kean Jr. In a 2022 rematch, Kean defeated Malinowski.

Early life and education
Malinowski was born in Słupsk, Poland, and lived in Brwinów until leaving the country at the age of six with his mother, Joanna, who married Blair Clark. He was raised in Princeton, New Jersey, and graduated from Princeton High School in 1983, where he wrote for the school newspaper The Tower and was an intern in Senator Bill Bradley's office. Malinowski received a Bachelor of Arts in political science from the University of California, Berkeley, in 1987 and a Master of Philosophy from St Antony's College, Oxford, in 1991, where he was a Rhodes Scholar.

Career

Early career 
Malinowski worked as a special assistant to Senator Daniel Patrick Moynihan in 1988. He worked for the Institute for Human Sciences in Vienna, Austria, and later as a research assistant for the Ford Foundation in 1993. From 1994 to 1998, Malinowski was a speechwriter for Secretaries of State Warren Christopher and Madeleine Albright as well as a member of the Policy Planning Staff at the Department of State. From 1998 to 2001, Malinowski served as senior director on the National Security Council at the White House.

Human Rights Watch
From 2001 to 2013, Malinowski was the Washington director for Human Rights Watch. In this position, he advocated for the end of torture techniques and black sites used by the U.S. government during the War on Terror. He campaigned for democratic reforms in Myanmar and financial sanctions on its leadership. Malinowski argued for the recognition of women's rights as a precondition to any peace talks with the Taliban. He also pushed for a no-fly zone in Syria during the ongoing civil war. Malinowski opposed supplying Israel with cluster munitions because of their misuse in Lebanon and asked then-Senator Hillary Clinton to not support Israel's construction of a wall in the occupied West Bank.

Assistant Secretary of State 
Some saw Malinowski as a likely nominee for Assistant Secretary of State for Democracy, Human Rights, and Labor, but his previous registration as a lobbyist while at Human Rights Watch necessitated a waiver from the President. On July 8, 2013, during Obama's second term, Malinowski was nominated to serve as Assistant Secretary of State for Democracy, Human Rights, and Labor. He testified before the Senate Foreign Relations Committee on September 24, 2013, and was confirmed by the U.S. Senate on April 2, 2014. According to columnist Jennifer Rubin, leaders from both parties praised Malinowski in 2014 for his defense of human rights and his work toward ending torture.

In 2016, Malinowski said the State Department planned to release a list of North Korean human rights abusers. He backed the United Nations' efforts to investigate possible war crimes committed during the Sri Lankan Civil War. He assisted with sanctioning Russian officials under the Magnitsky Act for human rights abuses.

In July 2014, Bahrain's government expelled Malinowski after he met with members of a Bahraini opposition group during a scheduled visit. The foreign ministry of Bahrain asserted that his meeting was an improper intervention in the country's affairs but said the incident would not affect Bahrain–U.S. relations. The U.S. State Department released a statement of concern about the actions while Secretary of State John Kerry called Bahrain's actions unacceptable and contrary to diplomatic protocol. Malinowski returned to Bahrain in December 2014 with the Assistant Secretary of State for Near Eastern Affairs.

Following the end of his tenure at the State Department, Malinowski joined fellow former Obama officials to lobby Congress to prevent the Trump administration from lifting the sanctions on Russia following its annexation of Crimea. He criticized Donald Trump for having an "obscene fondness" for the world's tyrants and for instituting a "complete departure from decades of American tradition."

U.S. House of Representatives

Elections

2018 

On October 2, 2017, Malinowski announced his candidacy for New Jersey's 7th congressional district in the 2018 midterm elections. He decided to run for Congress after the 2016 election of Donald Trump, which he saw as an indication that America was in "deep trouble". Malinowski cited health care, immigration, diplomacy, environmental policy, and  infrastructure as areas of focus.

Malinowski supports the Affordable Care Act and criticized the Republican Party's attempts to dismantle it. He supports a public health insurance option, but opposes Medicare for all. He supports raising the minimum wage to $15 per hour as well as stronger collective bargaining rights and protections for workers.

In the June 5 Democratic primary election, Malinowski defeated social worker Peter Jacob and lawyer Goutam Jois with 66.8% of the vote, winning all counties in the district.

Malinowski won the November 6 general election with 51.7% of the vote. He and Lance each carried three of the district's six counties; Malinowski won Essex, Somerset and Union, while Lance carried Morris, Warren and his native Hunterdon. But Malinowski won the district's shares of Somerset and Union counties, the two most populous counties in the district, by 22,300 votes, which exceeded the overall margin of 16,200 votes.

2020 

During his reelection campaign, Malinowski faced death threats after introducing a bill condemning the conspiratorial group QAnon. The National Republican Congressional Committee then aired ads falsely accusing him of lobbying to protect sexual predators when he worked for Human Rights Watch.

Malinowski was reelected, defeating New Jersey Senate Republican leader Tom Kean Jr. by 1.2%. Due to the very close margin, the election remained unresolved for weeks. In terms of both absolute numbers and vote percentage, Malinowski's race was the closest House race in the country to be won by a Democrat.

2022 

Malinowski unsuccessfully ran for reelection in the district for the 2022 elections in a rematch against Tom Kean Jr.

Tenure 
When he took office in January 2019, Malinowski became the first Democrat to represent the 7th since 1956.

Malinowski was the first member of the New Jersey House delegation to call to begin the impeachment inquiry against Trump in May 2019. He endorsed Democratic presidential nominee Joe Biden in January 2020.

During his first term, Malinowski advocated for efforts to prohibit weapons sales to Saudi Arabia for use in the Yemen conflict. He also advocated for accountability related to Saudi Arabia’s role in the murder of Jamal Khashoggi. His work contributed to the release of the Khashoggi Report and the subsequent Khashoggi ban.

American video game company Activision Blizzard punished a Hong Kong-based professional gamer for supporting pro-democracy Hong Kong protests. Malinowski accused Blizzard and Apple of censorship. He co-signed a letter to Activision Blizzard CEO Bobby Kotick that read, "As China amplifies its campaign of intimidation, you and your company must decide whether to look beyond the bottom line and promote American values—like freedom of speech and thought—or to give in to Beijing’s demands in order to preserve market access."

The America COMPETES Act legislation, passed by the House in February 2022, included provisions Malinowski wrote. He was subsequently appointed to the conference committee that finalized the bill.

Controversy 
In April 2021, the Associated Press reported that Malinowski had traded approximately $1 million of stock in medical and tech companies involved in the COVID-19 pandemic response. Malinowski failed to disclose the trades within the period of time required by federal law; he said the failure to disclose the trades was an error. Two complaints were filed against him with the Office of Congressional Ethics, which announced in October 2021 that it found "substantial reason to believe" that Malinowski had violated federal laws designed to defend against conflicts of interest. The Office of Congressional Ethics formally referred its Malinowski investigation to the House Committee on Ethics, which continued its own investigation. The House Ethics Committee's investigation into Malinowski's stock trading is ongoing.

Voting record 
As of June 2022, Malinowski had voted in line with Joe Biden's stated position 98.2% of the time.

Committee assignments 
 Committee on Foreign Affairs (Vice Chair)
 Subcommittee on the Middle East, North Africa and International Terrorism
 Subcommittee on Oversight and Investigations
 Committee on Transportation and Infrastructure
Subcommittee on Highways and Transit
Subcommittee on Railroads, Pipelines, and Hazardous Materials
Subcommittee on Water Resources and Environment
Committee on Homeland Security
Subcommittee on Intelligence and Counterterrorism

Caucus memberships 
 Caucus Against Foreign Corruption and Kleptocracy (co-chair) 
 Egypt Human Rights Caucus (co-chair)
 COVID-19 Global Vaccination Caucus (co-chair)
 Protection of Civilians in Conflict Caucus (co-chair)
 SALT Caucus (founding member)
 LGBT Equality Caucus
 New Democrat Coalition
 End Corruption Caucus
Problem Solvers Caucus (second term only)
 House Pro-Choice Caucus

Electoral history

Personal life
Malinowski moved to Rocky Hill, New Jersey, close to where he grew up, in September 2017. In 2020, he moved to the Ringoes section of East Amwell Township, New Jersey.

Malinowski's stepfather Blair Clark was a journalist. Clark's sister was Anne Martindell, a member of the New Jersey State Senate (1974–1977) and a United States ambassador to New Zealand (1979–1981).

Malinowski has faced charges related to driving on a suspended license.

Malinowski has one daughter.

References

External links

 

|-

|-

1965 births
Alumni of St Antony's College, Oxford
American Rhodes Scholars
Candidates in the 2020 United States elections
Democratic Party members of the United States House of Representatives from New Jersey
Human Rights Watch people
Living people
People from East Amwell Township, New Jersey
People from Princeton, New Jersey
People from Rocky Hill, New Jersey
People from Słupsk
Polish emigrants to the United States
Princeton High School (New Jersey) alumni
United States Assistant Secretaries of State
United States National Security Council staffers
University of California, Berkeley alumni